Tibi et Igni is the tenth studio album by Polish death metal band Vader. It was released on 30 May 2014 through Nuclear Blast. The album was recorded by the Wiesławski brothers at Hertz Studio in Białystok, Poland. The album was preceded by the 7" EP Go to Hell, which was released on 18 April 2014.

Tibi et Igni is the first album to feature British drummer James Stewart, who replaced Pawel "Paul" Jaroszewicz in 2011.

Background
During an interview in February 2013, frontman Piotr "Peter" Wiwczarek announced that Vader had begun working on a new studio album with the working title Straight to Hell, which was set to be released in late 2013. In May 2013, Wiwczarek announced that Vader planned to enter the studio in December to record its upcoming album, which was set to be released in early 2014.

On 7 December 2013, it was announced that Vader had entered Hertz Studio in Białystok, Poland and had begun recording a new album, with a new working title, Tibi et Igni, which is a Latin phrase that means "For You and Fire". The band had planned to record 14 new songs and 4 bonus tracks, and revealed possible song titles, including "Abandon All Hope", "Bring Them to Me" and "Infernal Poetry".

On 29 December, Wiwczarek announced that tracking for the album would be completed by the end of January 2014, and the album would be completed by February. He also announced the album should be released by April or May 2014. On 7 March 2014, Vader announced that the band had finished recording the album, and that it will be released on 30 May 2014, through Nuclear Blast.

On 27 March, Vader released a teaser for Tibi et Igni. On 16 April, a lyric video for the song "Where Angels Weep" was released.

Release
Tibi et Igni is available as a standard CD, as a digipak CD with 2 bonus tracks, as a colored LP with a bonus 7" EP (including 2 bonus tracks), and exclusively through Nuclear Blast mailorder as a limited digipak edition with a signed Vader tourbook. The album features artwork from Joe Petagno, best known for his artwork for bands including Motörhead, Pink Floyd and Led Zeppelin.

The album reached number 18 on the US Billboard Top New Artist Albums (Heatseekers), selling around 1500 copies in two weeks. In Poland, Tibi et Igni landed at number 16, and dropped out two weeks later. The release also charted in France, Japan, Switzerland, and Germany.

To promote the album, Vader released three track by track videos.

Track listing

Personnel
Production and performance credits taken from album liner notes.

Vader
Piotr "Peter" Wiwczarek – vocals, guitars
Marek "Spider" Pająk – guitars
Tomasz "Hal" Halicki – bass
James Stewart – drums

Additional musicians
Marta Gabriel (Crystal Viper) – vocals ("Przeklęty na wieki (Cursed Eternally)")

Production
Wojtek and Sławek Wiesławscy – production, mixing, mastering, recording (at Hertz Recording Studio, Białystok, Poland, December 2013-February 2014)
Piotr Polak – sound engineering assistance
Joe Petagno – cover art
Mariusz Kmiołek – management
Adam Sieklicki, Robert Zembrzycki, Stefano Catalani – photography

"Where Angels Weep"

"Where Angels Weep" is the ninth single by Vader. It was released on 18 April 2014 by Nuclear Blast.

Track listing

Charts

Release history

References

Vader (band) albums
2014 albums
Nuclear Blast albums
Polish-language albums
German-language albums